Regional elections were held in Scotland on Thursday 6 May 1982, as part of the wider 1982 United Kingdom local elections. Whilst the 1982 elections saw the Conservatives hold up relatively well in England, the Tories did comparatively poorly in Scotland, where their already disadvantageous position worsened. The Conservatives did particularly poorly in Strathclyde, where the Conservative group leader lost his seat.

Despite this poor performance, the Conservatives were actually seen as doing somewhat well in the overall Scottish context; the Conservative vote had, prior to the election, been languishing around 18% in Scotland. This was somewhat credited to a modest "Falkland Effect;" a surge in Conservative support due to their handling of the ongoing Falklands War.

The SDP-Liberal Alliance managed to displace the SNP into fourth place, although this increase in support ultimately did not translate into major seat gains due to the FPTP nature of the ward electoral system.

Also notable was the success of candidates in Shetland supportive of Home Rule for the islands, who wished for something similar to that enjoyed by the Faroe Islands. Whilst no candidates appeared on the ballot as members of the Shetland Movement, the Shetland Movement did publish a list of candidates supportive of Shetland Home Rule. Ultimately, of the 25 members of the Shetland Islands Council, 14 were supporters of the movement.

National results

|-
!colspan=2|Parties
!Votes
!Votes %
!Wards
|-
| 
|572,776
|37.6
|186
|-
| 
|382,891
|25.1
|119
|-
| 
|276,824
|18.1
|25
|-
| 
|204,774
|13.4
|23
|-
| 
|5,537
|0.4
|1
|-
|
|
|1,228
|0.1
|0
|-
| 
|997
|0.1
|0
|-
| 
|402
|0.03
|0
|-
|
|
|264
|0.2
|0
|-
| 
|252
|0.02
|0
|-
|
|
|136
|0.01
|0
|-
|
|
|30
|0.002
|0
|-
| 
|77,626
|5.1
|87
|-
!colspan=2|Total!! 1,446,111 !! 100.0 !! 441
|}

Results by council area

References

 
Regional elections
1982
Scottish regional elections